The 1992 La Flèche Wallonne was the 56th edition of La Flèche Wallonne cycle race and was held on 15 April 1992. The race started in Spa and finished in Huy. The race was won by Giorgio Furlan of the Ariostea team.

General classification

References

1992 in road cycling
1992
1992 in Belgian sport